The We Wai Kai Nation, also known as the Wewaikai First Nation, the Cape Mudge First Nation and the Cape Mudge Indian Band, is the band government of the We Wai Kai subgroup of the Laich-kwil-tach (also Legwildok or Euclataws or Yucultas or "Southern Kwakiutl") group of the Kwakwaka'wakw peoples, based on Quadra Island offshore from Campbell River, British Columbia, Canada, which is on the east coast of Vancouver Island at the northern end of the Strait of Georgia.  The Laich-kwil-tach include the Wei Wai Kum, who are organized as the Campbell River First Nation, and the Kwiakah Nation, whose traditional territory is in the Discovery Islands to the northeast of that city and on the adjoining mainland coast.  All three are part of the Kwakiutl District Council, a tribal council which includes other Kwakwaka'wakw bands farther northwest in the Queen Charlotte Strait region and on northern Vancouver Island.

Indian Reserves

Indian Reserves under the band's administration are:
Village Bay Indian Reserve No. 7, 4.11 ha. in size, uninhabited (east coast of Quadra Island)
Open Bay Indian Reserve No. 8, 5.2 ha. in size, uninhabited (east coast of Quadra Island)
Drew Harbour Indian Reserve No. 9, 96.6 ha. in size; site of the We Wai Kai Campsite, a band-run business (east side of Quadra Island; also the site for the We Wai Kai Scallop Farm which is located in Suitl Channel.
Cape Mudge Indian Reserve No. 10, 458 ha. Site of the band-run businesses and services: the Tsa-Kwa-Luten Lodge, the Boatworks, the Nuyumbalees Culture Centre (formerly the Kwaguith Museum), the Band Administration Office, pre-school/daycare and approximately 65 homes for the Nations citizens and their families.
Quinsam Indian Reserve No. 12, 121 ha. Site of  121 hectares in size. Over 100 residential homes for their citizens and a 43 acre economic development zone.  The Quinsam Reserve also is the site of several businesses and services: a Shell gas station, Lee's Famous Ribs and Chicken, the Quinsam Liquor Store, the administration offices of the We Wai Kai Nation, the KDC Kwakiuth District Council, The Cape Mudge Band Learning Centre, the offices of the Aboriginal Headstart Program, and the Quinsam Wellness Centre.

Chief and councillors
As of January 2015 (1 year term)

Chief Councillor - Brian Assu,
Councillor - Ronnie Chickite,
Councillor - Ted Assu,
Councillor - Daniel Billy,
Councillor - Kim Duncan,
Councillor - Cindy Inrig,
Councillor - Ted Lewis,
Councillor - Keith Wilson Sr.,
Councillor - TBD

British Columbia Treaty Process

They are a member government of the negotiating group for the BC Treaty Process known as the Hamatla Treaty Society, and are also constituted for treaty negotiation purposes as the Laich-kwil-tach Council of Chiefs.The treaty society members are in Stage 4 of the BC Treaty Process.

Demographics
The We Wai Kai Nation has over 1100 registered members, living both on and off reserve.

Notable We Wai Kai Nation people
 Sonny Assu, interdisciplinary artist
Jody Wilson-Raybould, Regional Chief of the BC Assembly of First Nations, Minister of Justice and Attorney General of Canada from 2015 to 2019
 Chief Billy Assu

References

Kwakwaka'wakw governments
Mid Vancouver Island
Discovery Islands